Brief intervention can often be referred to as screening and brief intervention (SBI) or, in England, identification and brief advice (IBA). Brief interventions are a technique used to initiate change for an unhealthy or risky behaviour such as smoking, lack of exercise or alcohol misuse. This page primarily describes brief interventions as applied to alcohol. As an alcohol intervention it is typically targeted to non-dependent drinkers, or drinkers who might be experiencing problems but are not seeking treatment. It is an approach which aims to prevent the acceleration or impact of alcohol problems, and/or to reduce alcohol consumption. It can be carried out in a range of settings such as in primary care, emergency or other hospital departments, criminal justice settings, workplaces, online, university/college settings, and other settings. 

Brief intervention includes 'screening' or 'identification' whereby a persons drinking risk level is assessed using a validated tool such as the Alcohol Use Disorders Identification Test (AUDIT). This is then followed by some degree of feedback on this assessment. Alcohol Brief Interventions can be brief, such as delivered in a single session, or extended with multiple components or designed to be used multiple times.

It works in two ways:
by getting people to think differently about their alcohol use so that they begin to think about or make changes in their alcohol consumption.
by providing those who choose to drink with skills that allow them to consume alcoholic beverages in a safer way.

FRAMES
For alcohol misuse, the following elements have been identified as particularly important, and forming the acronym FRAMES:
Feedback on the risk for alcohol problems
Responsibility: where the individual with alcohol misuse is responsible for change
Advice: about reduction or explicit direction to change
Menu: providing a variety of strategies for change
Empathy, with a warm, reflective, empathic and understanding approach
Self-efficacy of the misusing person in making a change

Motivational interviewing
Brief interventions are based on motivational interviewing techniques.

Motivational interviewing is a technique which aims to be both non-judgmental and non-confrontational. Its success depends largely on the presentation of objective feedback based on information provided by an individual. The technique involves acknowledgement that individuals who attend a counselling session, assessment or prevention program may be at different levels of readiness to change their alcohol consumption patterns, including:

No perception of any alcohol consumption problem 
Realisation of alcohol consumption problem with no corresponding action 
Current active addressing of alcohol consumption problem 
Ongoing maintenance of reduced consumption

The technique attempts to increase a person's awareness of the potential problems caused, consequences experienced, and risks faced as a result of patterns of alcohol consumption. As feedback is presented, the clinician or program provider may foster the development of discrepancies between the perception that someone has of themselves and the reality of that person's situation.

This technique acknowledges that people may come to a counseling session, an assessment, or a prevention program at different levels of readiness to change their drinking behavior. Some people may have never thought of making changes in their drinking, others may have thought about it but not taken steps to change it, some may be actively trying to cut down, and others may have already cut down, and succeeded in maintaining reduced consumption. Motivational Interviewing attempts to address the specific issues that people are facing at any particular stage.

In short, the strategy seeks to prompt individuals to think differently about their use of alcohol and ultimately consider what might be gained through change.

Feedback
When the assessment is complete, people receive personalized feedback about their alcohol consumption and related behaviors. For instance, 'feedback' highlights that the person's drinking may be placing their health at risk, and is above recommended consumption guidelines. In groups (e.g., a social fraternity or sorority), feedback can be given based on data collected from group members prior to an intervention program. Some researchers have used mailed feedback after collecting data on a questionnaire such that no face-to-face interaction actually occurs.

Skills training
Skills training programs develop skills for consuming alcohol in a safer way. One of the limitations of information-only programs is that they may raise awareness and information about the effects of a substance, but leave the individual to make behavioural changes themselves.

Skills training programs can work well with motivational interviewing techniques, as skills training programs work to provide the individual with the skills to make these changes in their drinking behavior, as the motivational interviewing simultaneously works to make the individual aware of their behaviour.

In doing so, they provide harm reduction strategies for those who choose to drink. This means that moderate drinking goals may also be considered, recognising that any steps toward safer alcohol consumption are steps in the right direction. Consequently, while abstinence may be the optimal outcome for some people, skills for drinking in a way that will minimize harm can be considered if abstinence is not viewed as realistic, attainable, or attractive. For example, blood alcohol concentration level estimation training enables people to set limits for moderate goals that are unique to their gender, weight, and time spent drinking. Teaching practical strategies for reaching these limits, such as spacing one's drinks, pacing oneself, alternating alcoholic and non-alcoholic drinks, consuming food before drinking and drinking for promote success.

Evidence
A range of systematic reviews published by Cochrane have described a small to medium effect size showing change in primarily alcohol use as a result of these interventions. For example in a recent review of primary care patients including 69 studies, moderate quality evidence was found that brief interventions could reduce alcohol consumption in hazardous or harmful drinkers. Digital brief interventions were found to be similarly effective with again moderate quality evidence that online brief interventions targeting alcohol reduced drinks per week by three standard drinks. Whilst these reviews are robust, they are limited in their ability to summarise change because many of the studies are not measuring the same outcomes in the same way. One review found that in 405 trials, there were 2641 separate outcomes measured in 1560 different ways. When diverse outcomes are used, data is hard to bring together in a meta-analysis and there are problems with differing views on what shows whether an intervention shows Effectiveness or Efficacy. Others have sought to improve the field by creating a Core Outcome Set which can reduce the size of the problem of differing outcomes by creating an international standard for all BI evaluations through the International Network on Brief Interventions for Alcohol & Other Drugs.

References

External links
http://whqlibdoc.who.int/hq/2001/WHO_MSD_MSB_01.6b.pdf
 http://alcoholiba.com/

Alcohol abuse
Harm reduction